Three men can refer to:

Triumvirate, rule by three men
Three men and a baby, a 1987 American film